Betty Ellen Weir (later Bell, June 20, 1924 – March 6, 2020) was an American alpine skier. She competed in the downhill event at the 1952 Winter Olympics and placed 19th. Weir took up skiing in 1948 and placed second in the downhill at the 1952 U.S. Olympic trials. She retired soon after the Games and married Ned Bell in Sun Valley. She then worked for many years for Idaho Mountain Express newspaper.

References

1924 births
2020 deaths
American female alpine skiers
Olympic alpine skiers of the United States
Alpine skiers at the 1952 Winter Olympics
21st-century American women